Taft Stadium is a WPA-built stadium in Oklahoma City, Oklahoma. It is the current home to teams from Northwest Classen High School, John Marshall High School, Classen School of Advanced Studies, Oklahoma Centennial High School, as well as a professional soccer team, Oklahoma City Energy FC.  Built in 1934, the stadium closed in 2013 and reopened in 2015 following substantial renovation. As part of the renovation the seating capacity was reduced from approximately 18,000 to approximately 7,500, with the red-stone facade being the only feature left unaltered.  A new all-weather track replaced a dirt track which was installed in 1946. 

In addition to the high school uses for which it was designed, Taft Stadium also briefly hosted professional football games in 1968 as home of the Oklahoma City Plainsmen of the Continental Football League.  Professional soccer's Oklahoma City Slickers also hosted games there in 1982–1983, and (as the Oklahoma City Stampede) in 1984.

In January 2013, the Oklahoma City Public School District announced a plan to apply revenues from a past 2007 bond issue, as well as other funds, to substantially renovate both Taft Stadium and Speegle Stadium in Oklahoma City.  The combined budget was $19 million, with $9.7 million of that amount allocated to Taft Stadium specifically.  

In June 2013, the Oklahoma City Public Schools District announced they had granted a multi-year lease to OKC Pro Soccer, LLC, led by Tim McLaughlin. OKC Energy FC (USL Pro), owned by McLaughlin and Bob Funk, Jr. will begin play at Taft Stadium in 2015. A $2 per ticket surcharge will support Fields & Futures, a local nonprofit created in 2012 to support Oklahoma City Public Schools Athletics in its effort to rebuild 44 athletic fields and provide professional development and improved resources for the district's 265 coaches and 4,500 student-athletes.

NASCAR
Taft Stadium hosted a NASCAR Convertible Division race on June 8, 1956. The race was won by Allen Adkins.

References

External links
 Taft Stadium on Google Maps
 

College football venues
Oklahoma City Chiefs football
North American Soccer League stadiums
USL Championship stadiums
OKC Energy FC
American football venues in Oklahoma
High school football venues in the United States
Soccer venues in Oklahoma
Sports venues in Oklahoma City
1934 establishments in Oklahoma
Sports venues completed in 1934